Swatara is an unincorporated community in Macville Township, Aitkin County, Minnesota, United States. Although unincorporated, Swatara has a post office with the ZIP code 55785.

History
The community at one time was served by the Soo Line Railroad and had a railroad station.

Swatara and neighboring townships were considered as a potential location of the Minnesota Experimental City that was proposed by scientist Athelstan Spilhaus in the 1970s. The city was envisioned to house 250,000 people and would use experimental technologies and methodologies such as moving walkways and monorail systems for transportation and a transparent dome encapsulating the city.

Despite support from state legislature, and prominent companies such as Ford, Boeing, and Honeywell, Aitkin County residents pushed back against the proposed city, citing environmental concerns as well as concerns about changing their way of life. The newly formed Minnesota Pollution Control Agency voted to abandon the project in 1973.

Geography
Swatara is located along Aitkin County Road 7 (610th Street) near the junction with County Road 29 (Osprey Avenue). Nearby places include Hill City, Remer, and Haypoint. U.S. 169 is nearby. Swatara is located in the northwest part of Aitkin County. It is seven miles southwest of Hill City.

References

Unincorporated communities in Aitkin County, Minnesota
Unincorporated communities in Minnesota